Blindern Rugbyklubb is a Norwegian rugby club based in Oslo. They currently compete in the Norway Rugby Championship (15s and 7s). 
Originally known as Oslostudentenes IK (Oslo Students Sports Club), the name changed to attract more non-students.

History
The club was founded on 10 December 2010 and is today one of the largest clubs in Norway.

The strength of the club has until now being in the 7's team, but in the recent years their 15's-team has started to contest in the top of the Norwegian Rugby 15s-championship.

In the early years the club logo had been from the club's time as a Student Sports Team. This was not changed until the season of 2014.
The logo went from a golden harp to the antler of a deer. This was chosen to represent the club's Norwegian roots and the strength and speed of its players.

External links 
 Home page: blindernrugby.no

Rugby clubs established in 2010
Sport in Oslo